Yoanni Yera Montalvo  (born October 18, 1989) is a Cuban professional baseball pitcher for the Olmecas de Tabasco of the Mexican League,  Cocodrilos de Matanzas in the Cuban National Series, and the Charros de Jalisco in the Mexican Pacific League.

Career
Yera signed with the Olmecas de Tabasco of the Mexican League for the 2020 season. Yera did not play in a game in 2020 due to the cancellation of the Mexican League season because of the COVID-19 pandemic.

He joined the Algodoneros de Guasave for the 2020 Mexican Pacific League season.

On April 8, 2022, Yera re-signed with the Olmecas de Tabasco for the 2022 LMB season. On July 6, 2022, he threw a no-hitter in a game against the Generales de Durango.

International career
Yera played for the Cuban national baseball team at 2017 World Baseball Classic.

References

External links

1989 births
Living people
Baseball pitchers
Cocodrilos de Matanzas players
Olmecas de Tabasco players
Cuban expatriate baseball players in Mexico
2017 World Baseball Classic players
Baseball players at the 2015 Pan American Games
Baseball players at the 2019 Pan American Games
Pan American Games medalists in baseball
Pan American Games bronze medalists for Cuba
Medalists at the 2015 Pan American Games